The 2010 World Junior Championships in Athletics was an international athletics competition for athletes under the age of 20 which was held at the Moncton Stadium in Moncton, New Brunswick, Canada from 19 to 25 July 2010. A total of 44 athletics events were contested at the Championships, 22 by male and 22 by female athletes. It was the second time that the event took place in Canada, after the 1988 edition in Sudbury.  This became the last event announced by Scott Davis.

Katsiaryna Artsiukh of Belarus, the winner of the women's 400 m hurdles title, had a positive test for Metenolone (a banned steroid) on the day of her victory. She was banned from the sport for two years.

Opening ceremony
The competition opened the evening of 19 July and, following a ninety-minute light and music presentation, the championships were officially opened by the Prime Minister of Canada Stephen Harper and Gary Lunn, the Minister for Sport. One event was held on the first day, the women's 3000 metres, and the Prime Minister awarded Mercy Cherono with the first gold medal of the competition.

Men's results

Track

Field

Women's results

Track

Field

Medal table 

All Information taken from IAAF's website.

Participation
According to an unofficial count through an unofficial result list, 1313 athletes from 163 countries participated in the event.  This is in agreement with the official numbers as published.

See also
List of junior world records in athletics
2010 in athletics (track and field)

References 

Daily session reports
Martin, David (2010-07-20). Moncton 2010 – Lee progresses easily to next round in the heat and humidity – Day one Morning WRAP. IAAF. Retrieved on 2010-07-26.
Martin, David (2010-07-20). Moncton 2010 – Masai scorches to 10,000m victory as Arcanjo wins Shot Put – Day One Evening WRAP. IAAF. Retrieved on 2010-07-26.
Martin, David (2010-07-21). Moncton 2010 – Russians blitz of one-two in Race Walk final – Day Three Morning WRAP. IAAF. Retrieved on 2010-07-26.
Martin, David (2010-07-21). Lee and Williams celebrate 100m victories – Day Three Evening session Wrap. IAAF. Retrieved on 2010-07-26.
Martin, David (2010-07-22). Lee disqualified for false start as torrential rain delays field events in Moncton – Day Four Morning Wrap. IAAF. Retrieved on 2010-07-26.
Martin, David (2010-07-22). Moncton 2010 – Kenya's Ndiku thwarts rivals with gun-to-tape 1500 win – Day Four Evening Wrap. IAAF. Retrieved on 2010-07-26.
Martin, David (2010-07-23). Filipchuk wins but Cai denies another Russian one-two in race walk – Day five morning wrap. IAAF. Retrieved on 2010-07-26.
Martin, David (2010-07-24). Stormy Kendrik finishes like a thunderbolt to win USA’s first championships gold – Day Five Evening Wrap. IAAF. Retrieved on 2010-07-26.
Martin, David (2010-07-24). Artsiukh’s blazing turn of speed in final 100 secures 400m Hurdles success – Day six Wrap. IAAF. Retrieved on 2010-07-26.
Martin, David (2010-07-25). Bogale wins 1500m but Ireland’s Mageean takes historical silver – Final Day Wrap. IAAF. Retrieved on 2010-07-26.

External links
 Official results
Official City of Moncton website
Moncton 2010 Team Manual

 
World Athletics U20 Championships
World Junior Championships in Athletics
International track and field competitions hosted by Canada
Sport in Moncton
World Junior Championships in Athletics
World Junior Championships in Athletics
World Junior Championships in Athletics
Sports competitions in New Brunswick